Openwashing or open washing (a compound word modeled on “whitewash” and derived from “greenwashing”) is a term to describe presenting something as open, when it is not actually open. In the context of openwashing, ‘open’ refers to transparency, access to information, participation, and knowledge sharing.

Usage 
The term was coined by Michelle Thorne, an Internet and climate policy scholar, in 2009. Thorne used Berlin Partner as an example of openwashing when their marketing campaign featured the slogan “be open. be free. be Berlin,” despite terms of use that contradict principles of openness.

In 2016, openwashing was discussed at the Open Exchange for Social Change Unconference in Madrid. This familiarized international scholars to the term but did not result in a universal or changed definition.

Evgeny Morozov criticized the term openwashing because of its failure to concretely define what openness means. Morozov argued that with many definitions of openness, open source, and open data, openwashing can be used in many contexts and "helps us question the authenticity of open initiatives" but does not indicate the barrier to openness itself.

Openwashing by governments 
Ana Brandusescu of the World Wide Web Foundation wrote that governments practice openwashing “when information released about government contracts is not detailed enough for the public to have a full picture of what that contract means.” This could mean excluding information about how governments decide who contracts are awarded to or how money was spent after allocation.

Maximilian Heimstädt researched open data initiatives in New York City, London, and Berlin to measure any instances of openwashing. Heimstädt found that in all three cities, governments were selective in what they publish to maintain secrecy of sensitive information and transparency. This form of openwashing is known as decoupling.

Examples of openwashing in private industry

VMWare and Microsoft 
In 2012, Red Hat Inc. accused VMWare Inc. and Microsoft Corp. of openwashing in relation to their cloud products. Red Hat claimed that VMWare and Microsoft were marketing their cloud products as open source, despite charging fees per machine using the cloud products.

Regulation 
There is currently no explicitly defined regulation or ban of openwashing. However, existing regulations surrounding deceptive marketing may legally prevent openwashing. For example, in the United States, the Federal Trade Commission protects customers from fraud and deceptive messaging. In Canada, the Competition Act prevents businesses from misleading or deceiving customers about their products and services, including about their open business practices.

Other forms of ‘washing’ have caused legal action to be taken. In 2022, international fast fashion company H&M was sued by Chelsea Commodore for greenwashing, with ongoing reviews of other fast fashion companies by domestic competition bureaus potentially causing further legal action.

References 

Advertising techniques